Clamor Heinrich Abel (1634 – 25 July 1696) was a German composer, violone player and organist.

Abel was born in Hünnefeld, Westphalia, Germany.  He worked as a court musician in Köthen, an organist in Celle and from 1666, as a ducal chamber musician in Hanover. From 1694, he was Obermusicus in Bremen and he remained at this post until his death at Bremen in 1696.

Among his best-known works are compositions for string orchestra and chamber music. He composed a collection of 59 individual works under the title Erstlinge musikalischer Blumen. They included works for four instruments and basso continuo - allemandes, courantes, preludes, sarabandas and sonatinas. First they were published in three volumes in Frankfurt (1674, 1676, 1677) and later they were published together as Drei Opera musica (Brunswick, 1687).

He was the father of the violist and violinist Christian Ferdinand Abel and grandfather of the viol virtuoso and composer Carl Friedrich Abel and Leopold August Abel.

Works
Erstlinge musikalischer Blumen
Bataille D Major for 2 violins and basso continuo
Sonata Sopra Cuccu for violin and basso continuo
Folie d'Espagne (1685)

External links
 
Folie d'Espagne - sheet music excerpt and MIDI
The Hanover orchestral repertory, 1672–1714: significant source discoveries
Thematic Index of music for viols, under A

1634 births
1696 deaths
German classical composers
German Baroque composers
17th-century classical composers
German male classical composers
17th-century male musicians